St Ola is a parish on Mainland, Orkney. It is in the centre of the island, east of the parish Firth and north of Holm. It contains the capital and largest town of the Orkney archipelago, Kirkwall. Both Kirkwall (church-bay) and St Ola may take their name from the church of St. Olaf, built about 1035 on the north bank of the Willow burn, which stands just below the local primary school.

Highland Park, the most northerly Scotch whisky distillery, is on the outskirts of Kirkwall.

Several ships of the North of Scotland, Orkney & Shetland Steam Navigation Company (later P&O Scottish Ferries) were named St Ola.

Prof John Tait was born here in 1878.

References

Parishes of Orkney
Kirkwall